The Department of Library and Information Science, University of Delhi is a department set up in 1946 in the University of Delhi, India.

History 

The department was established in 1946 with the efforts of Dr. S. R. Ranganathan, Prof. S. Dasgupta and Sir Maurice Bwyer. This was the first full-fledged Library Science Department established in the country. It is recognized as an Associated Project of UNESCO.

The department took concrete steps in 1972 to introduce new areas of study in information science and management such as Computer and its Application in Libraries, Information Storage and Retrieval, and Library Systems Analysis & Statistical Methods in its curriculum. The department revised its syllabi in 2004 and again new papers were introduced in B.L.I.Sc. and M.L.I.Sc..

The department revised its syllabi again in 2009 and implementing since academic year 2009–2010 with more emphasis on Information and Computer Technology applications in Libraries in B.L.I.Sc. and M.L.I.Sc. programmes. A special paper on Information Literacy Applications in LIS was introduced at M.L.I.Sc. level and a paper on Marketing of LIS Products and Services and Management Consultancy.

The department is adequately equipped with good ICT infrastructure for students not only for class room teaching but also for hands on practicals. It provides internet searching facilities including email facilities. The department provides facilities for Library, Hostel facilities for outside students, Medical facilities, Freeship and scholarships for meritorious students.

LIS Courses 

 Bachelor of Library and Information Science (B.L.I.Sc.)
 Master of Library and Information Science (M.L.I.Sc.)
 Master of Philosophy (M.Phil.)
 Doctor of Philosophy (Ph.D.)
 Post Doctoral Research

DLIS Library 

The library provides information on Library and Information Science books, journals, e-resources and useful websites. This library was set up as a part of the department in 1946 and has been fully computerized. The department library is having 18,500 of documents includes text books, M.Phil. Dissertations, M.L.I.Sc. Project reports, etc.

JLIS 

The Department of Library and Information Science, University of Delhi, started Journal of Library and Information Science (JLIS) in June 1976. Its frequency is half yearly and 40 volumes have already been published.

References

External links 
 Official website
 Admissions Information

Delhi University
University departments in India